Friesland is an unincorporated community in Dell Grove Township, Pine County, Minnesota, United States.

The community is located between Hinckley and Sandstone; near the intersection of Pine County 61, Pine County 26, and the former Northern Pacific Railway (now the Willard Munger State Trail).

History
Located in the southeast corner of Dell Grove Township, Friesland is named after the northern province of the Netherlands. It operated a post office from 1896 to 1917.

References

 Official State of Minnesota Highway Map – 2011/2012 edition

Unincorporated communities in Minnesota
Unincorporated communities in Pine County, Minnesota